is a former Japanese football player and manager.

Playing career
Adachi was born in Nishinomiya on July 2, 1969. During the Funabashi High School, he served as captain and led the team play, introducing a special block signs. After graduating from Senshu University, he joined Yokohama Flügels in 1992. However he could not play at all in the match and retired end of 1992 season.

Coaching career
After retirement, Adachi started coaching career at Yokohama Flügels from 1993. After that, he coached mainly youth team at Yokohama F. Marinos and Japan U-17 national team. In 2006, he joined his local club Vissel Kobe. Through mainly youth team manager, he became a coach for top team from 2010. In April 2012, manager Masahiro Wada was sacked and he became a manager as caretaker. He managed the club until Akira Nishino became a new manager in May. However Nishino was sacked in November and Adachi became a new manager. Although he managed the club again, the club was relegated to J2 League end of 2012 season. In 2013, the club won the 2nd place and returned to J1 League. He resigned end of 2014 season. In 2015, he moved to V-Varen Nagasaki and became a coach. In 2017, he returned to Vissel and worked as stuff until November. In May 2018, he signed with Kataller Toyama and became a manager as Tetsuro Uki successor.

Managerial statistics
Update; December 31, 2018

References

External links

1969 births
Living people
Senshu University alumni
Association football people from Hyōgo Prefecture
Japanese footballers
J1 League players
Yokohama Flügels players
Japanese football managers
J1 League managers
J2 League managers
J3 League managers
Vissel Kobe managers
Kataller Toyama managers
Association football forwards